Carybdeida is an order of box jellyfish. There are five families within the order. They are distinguished from other box jellyfish by the presence of unbranched muscular bases at the corners of the cubic umbrella. Most species have four tentacles.

References

 
Cubozoa